Bellevue is a settlement on the island of Saint Croix in the United States Virgin Islands. It is a western suburb of Christiansted. The geographic area is 140 acres of which the majority are forested. Of the 140 acres half 70 acres belong to the Bond family which since 1956 has owned a federally registered Caribbean Mahogany Reforestation Tree Farm. The property adjoins the Estate Thomas research property belonging to the International Institute for Tropical Forestry of the United States Forest Service.

References

Populated places in Saint Croix, U.S. Virgin Islands